The 1983 Orange Bowl was the 49th edition of the college football bowl game, played at the Orange Bowl in Miami, Florida, on Saturday, January 1. Part of the 1982–83 bowl game season, it matched the thirteenth-ranked LSU Tigers of the Southeastern Conference (SEC) and the #3 Nebraska Cornhuskers of the Big Eight Conference. Favored Nebraska won by a point, 21–20.

The game suffered its lowest attendance (54,407) in 36 years, due to civil disturbances in the nearby Overtown neighborhood, as well as the game having no impact on the national championship, since  second-ranked Penn State was playing #1 Georgia at the same time in the Sugar Bowl in New Orleans. In addition, Nebraska had played at Hawaii in December (and in the previous Orange Bowl), while LSU had lost two of its last three  games of the regular season.

Teams

LSU

One week after toppling Alabama, any faint national championship hopes LSU harbored were blown away with a stunning 27–24 loss to Mississippi State in Starkville. The Tigers recovered the next week to rout Florida State  in Baton Rouge to earn an Orange Bowl berth, but they inexplicably dropped a  decision to Tulane, a 28-point underdog, at home in the regular season finale. It was the Green Wave's first victory at Tiger Stadium since 1948, and is Tulane's last triumph in the series, which has not been played on a yearly basis since 1994. Despite the November swoon, LSU came into the bowl game ranked thirteenth in the AP and UPI polls. LSU was making a fifth Orange Bowl appearance, the first in nine years.

Nebraska

The Huskers were in their ninth Orange Bowl, the second of three consecutive appearances.

Game summary
Nebraska forced a three and out, and then scored easily on their first possession, capped by a five-yard touchdown run by fullback Mark Schellen to take a  just four minutes into the game, and the heavily favored Huskers looked as if they would put the Tigers away early. But then a series of miscues turned the game on its head.

Toby Williams intercepted a Tiger pass at the Husker seven to thwart a promising LSU drive. But the Huskers fumbled the ball right back to LSU on the very next play from scrimmage, and Dalton Hilliard scored from the one to tie the game at seven.

Nebraska drove to the LSU 15 before fumbling again, then inexplicably fumbled a third time after forcing LSU to punt. Turner Gill then threw an interception. The Tigers took advantage with a second Hilliard 1-yard touchdown run, and Nebraska found itself trailing  at halftime after committing four turnovers on four consecutive series.

Halftime provided no relief for the mistake-prone Husker offense, with a missed field goal on the opening drive of the second half, followed by yet another fumble. LSU converted the latest Husker error into a 28-yard Juan Bentanzos field goal, which gave them a 

On the very next series, Nebraska held on to the football and went on a 12-play, 80-yard scoring drive, capped by an 11-yard swing pass from Turner Gill to Mike Rozier which pulled the Huskers within three 

Gill then finished off a seven-play, 47-yard drive with a quarterback sneak early in the fourth to put the Huskers ahead  Another miscue, this time a dropped pass on a fake field goal, prevented the Huskers from extending their lead. LSU got a 49-yard field goal from Bentanzos late following an interception (Nebraska's sixth turnover of the night), but they could not get the ball back again, and the Cornhuskers held on

Scoring
First quarter
Nebraska – Mark Schellen 5-yard run (Kevin Seibel kick), 10:57
LSU – Dalton Hilliard 1-yard run (Juan Betanzos kick), 4:24
Second quarter
LSU – Hilliard 1-yard run (Betanzos kick), 9:32
Third quarter
LSU – Betanzos 28-yard field goal, 6:40
Nebraska – Mike Rozier 11-yard pass from Turner Gill (Seibel kick), 1:25
Fourth quarter
Nebraska – Gill 1-yard run (Seibel kick), 11:14
LSU – Betanzos 49-yard field goal, 5:05

Statistics
{| class=wikitable style="text-align:center"
! Statistics !! LSU !!  Nebraska 
|-
|align=left|First Downs || 12|| 22
|-
|align=left|Rushes–yards|| 31–38|| 58–219
|-
|align=left|Passing yards || 173 || 184
|-
|align=left|Passes (C–A–I)|| 14–30–2 || 13–22–2
|-
|align=left|Total Offense || 61–211 || 80–403
|-
|align=left|Punts–average ||6–39|| 1–31
|-
|align=left|Fumbles–lost ||1–0|| 4–4
|-
|align=left|Turnovers|| 2|| 6
|-
|align=left|Penalties-yards ||8–57|| 4–25
|-
|align=left|Time of possession ||25:28||34:32
|}

Aftermath
Nebraska remained in third in the final AP poll and LSU climbed to eleventh.

Nebraska played in its third consecutive Orange Bowl the following year; through 2021, LSU has yet to return.

These two teams met again in the Sugar Bowl in January 1985 and 1987, both won by Nebraska.

References

External links
http://www.huskers.com/ViewArticle.dbml?SPSID=185&SPID=41&DB_OEM_ID=100&ATCLID=151

Orange Bowl
Orange Bowl
LSU Tigers football bowl games
Nebraska Cornhuskers football bowl games
January 1983 sports events in the United States
Orange Bowl